Maresca is a surname. Notable people with the surname include:

Enzo Maresca (born 1980), Italian professional footballer
Ernie Maresca (1938–2015), American singer-songwriter and record company executive
John J. Maresca, Italian-American diplomat, business leader, and educator
Pupetta Maresca (born 1935), aka Pupetta (Little Doll), a former beauty queen and a well-known figure in the Camorra

See also
Moresca